Space Track may refer to various facilities and systems for Project Space Track and other space surveillance operations (in chronological order):

Project Space Track at the Air Force Cambridge Research Center (CRC) in the late 1950s
National Space Surveillance Control Center, a Hanscom Field facility dedicated February 9, 1960, that replaced the CRC directorate's operations
Space Detection and Tracking System (SPADATS), USAF computer system 496L at Ent AFB that superseded the NSSCC in July 1961
SPACETRACK Operations Center, the facility renamed from the former SPADAT Operations Center at the end of 1962.
Space Defense Center, the Ent AFB and October 1966 Cheyenne Mountain facility for detection and tracking
Space Defense Operations Center (SPADOC), a facility established at the Cheyenne Mountain nuclear bunker in 1979
United States Space Surveillance Network, the network feeding data to the current center
Joint Space Operations Center, at Vandenberg AFB